Taman is a rural locality (a stanitsa) in Temryuksky District of Krasnodar Krai, Russia, located on the coast of the Taman Bay. It is the administrative center of the Taman rural settlement. Its population was recorded at 9,417 people (2020),  and

History
Taman occupies the site of the ancient cities of Hermonassa and Tmutarakan. From the end of the 15th century until 1783, this was a site of a Turkish fortress. Before the annexation it was a sanjak subordinate to the eyalet of Kaffa.

The modern stanitsa was founded by the Zaporozhian Cossacks under Anton Golovaty on August 25, 1792 as the latter's residence and the first garrison of the Black Sea Cossack Host. Until 1849, Taman was officially considered to be a town, even though it had no local government of its own and was governed from the nearby stanitsa of Akhtanizovskaya. In 1849, Taman was re-organized as a stanitsa and established local government of its own.

Taman was under German occupation from September 1942 until they were completely pushed out of the Taman Peninsula in October 1943.

Port of Taman
In August 2008, then-Prime Minister Vladimir Putin signed a government resolution authorizing the development of a major international cargo port several kilometers south of Taman. Currently, a fertilizer terminal is under construction there to link with the ammonia pipeline to Odessa owned by TogliattiAzot.

In August 2013 Transport Minister Maksim Sokolov said that the Port of Taman would open in 2019 to handle dry cargoes, such as grain and coal. He also added that federal spending would amount to $2.3 billion, while private investors were expected to contribute the remaining 152 billion rubles.

As of 2012, the first tonne of cargo was planned to be sent from the port in September 2016.

Sights
Principal sights of Taman include:
The ruins of Hermonassa and Tmutarakan.
A Turkish condensate pump dating from the 15th century.
An archeological museum imitating the Roman domus.
The memorial house of Mikhail Lermontov. The fourth part of his novel A Hero of Our Time is set in Taman.
A small wine-making museum.
A museum devoted to the history of Kuban Cossackdom.
An Orthodox church built by the first Cossack settlers in 1793. This is the oldest Russian Orthodox church in the Kuban region.
Amandus Adamson's monument to the first Cossack settlers of the region (1911).

References

Rural localities in Krasnodar Krai
Taman Peninsula
Populated places established in 1792
Port cities and towns in Russia